Pedal Me is an e-cargo bike logistics and pedicab company in London. The company was founded in 2017 by Benjamin Knowles, a transport planner, Chris Dixon and Rob Sargent. Pedal Me says that in Central London, it is cheaper and quicker than the taxi service Uber, although this advantage is lost further out from the city centre.

The company normally operates within 5 miles of Central London, using bikes built by Urban Arrow in the Netherlands which can carry two adult passengers. The company also offers cargo deliveries, which have outstripped the number of journeys carrying passengers. In a trial run by TfL, the company's riders dropped off construction materials from Wood Green to Whitechapel faster than a van. The contractor plans to continue receiving deliveries by bike. In May 2019, the charity Sustrans decided to use Pedal Me to move all of their office equipment 2.7 miles across London.

The company employs 45 people. As of November 2019, it has 42 bikes in its fleet.

Coronavirus lockdown
During the lockdown in April and May 2020, Pedal Me partnered with Lambeth Council to deliver 10,000 care packages to the individuals and families most in need. This was the largest operation conducted in Pedal Me's history, and perhaps the single largest e-cargo bike logistics operation in the UK. In total, the Pedal Me fleet covered over 20,000 km to distribute nearly 10,000 packages, moving around about 150,000 kg across the borough of Lambeth.

In December 2020, Pedal Me said that they were opening a 6,500sq ft warehouse in Zone 1 to support their freight operations.
In February 2021, Pedal Me offered free rides to Londoners going to and from their Covid vaccinations.

References

Cycling in London
Vehicles for hire
Taxi vehicles
Rickshaws
Companies based in London